Navelencia is an unincorporated community in Fresno County, California, United States. The farmland surrounding Navelencia supports orchards of oranges and other citrus trees. The township's name is a portmanteau of two varieties of oranges: navel and valencia. This orange-themed naming is shared with the neighboring city, Orange Cove.

A post office operated at Navelencia from 1915 to 1931.

References

Unincorporated communities in California
Unincorporated communities in Fresno County, California